Alice Wilkes (also spelt Welkes, married name Alice Restwold) was a servant to Katherine Howard, the fifth wife of Henry VIII of England and was a significant witness in Queen Katherine's trial for treason and adultery.

Alice's husband was Anthony Restwold, a Member (MP) of the Parliament of England for New Woodstock in November 1554 and for Aylesbury in 1555.

References

Year of birth missing
Year of death missing
Women of the Tudor period
16th-century English women
Treason